Baseball ACT is the governing body of Baseball within the Australian Capital Territory. Baseball ACT is governed by the Australian Baseball Federation

External links
 Baseball ACT

Sports governing bodies in the Australian Capital Territory
Act